Friends of the Everglades is a conservationist and activist organization in the United States whose mission is to "preserve, protect, and restore the only Everglades in the world." The book Biosphere 2000: Protecting Our Global Environment refers to Friends of the Everglades as an organization that has fought to preserve North America's only subtropical wetland.

The organization was created in 1969-1970 by journalist, author, and environmental activist Marjory Stoneman Douglas who wrote the book The Everglades: River of Grass in 1947, about the Florida Everglades. When the organization was first founded, it soon had 500 members, eventually reaching 6,000 members. Douglas was 79 when she founded the organization. Current membership is approximately 5,000.

It outlines its goals as being to:

 Compel government agencies to comply with existing environmental laws, and resist any efforts to weaken such laws.
Encourage politicians to recognize the long consequences of their actions.
Spread awareness of the importance of the Everglades to the South Florida ecosystem.

The organization 1000 Friends of Florida describes Friends of the Everglades as a "non-profit grassroots organization dedicated to protecting and restoring the Everglades." It "strives to protect and restore the Greater Kissimmee-Okeechobee-Everglades Ecosystem." The "primary tools" of Friends of the Everglades are legal advocacy and education.

Development

Environmental activist Kai Marshall and Browder's office manager Judy Wilson were influential in persuading Marjory Stoneman Douglas to start an organization to protect the Everglades. The organization was started with a one-dollar membership contribution from Marjory Douglas as its first member. Governor Reubin Askew, who was Governor of Florida from 1971 to 1979 was supportive of Friends of the Everglades according to Douglas in her book, Voice of the River. While membership is now thirty-five dollars, Friends maintains its one-dollar contribution membership fee for the school-based Young Friends of the Everglades.

What is now Everglades National Park was created in 1947, and is recently as 1998, has been referred to as "the most endangered national park in America."  Some of the environmental issues facing the Everglades are, disrupted water flow, a drastic decline in the wading bird population, invasion of exotic species and the survival challenges facing the Florida panther, of which there are only 160 left in the wild, an increase from 20 wild Florida panthers in the 1970s. Additionally, species such as the wood stork, the Cape Sable seaside sparrow and the manatee have an uncertain future in the Everglades as a result of environmental issues.  Former Secretary of Friends of the Everglades, Sharyn Richardson said that she got started with the organization, attracted by its philosophical ideals, stating, "when you see an injustice and you become aware of that injustice, you have to take responsibility for it."

Friends of the Everglades is one of dozens of organizations involved in environmental efforts in the Florida Everglades, among which are the National Audubon Society and the National Parks Conservation Association (NPCA).

Legal and lobbying actions

Friends of the Everglades has taken legal actions over the years to protect the Everglades from overdevelopment and pollution.

When Marjory Stoneman Douglas first began the organization, Friends, along with the work of other individual activists, was instrumental in persuading the Richard Nixon administration to stop the development of the Miami International Airport in the Everglades.

It has taken legal action to stop South Florida Water Management District from back-pumping agricultural chemicals from Big Sugar's plantations into Lake Okeechobee and to require proper treatment of agricultural chemicals discharged to the Everglades from the Everglades Agricultural Area (EAA). Friends also has protested government plans to build 63 square miles of stormwater treatment area (STAs) or filtering marshes to absorb excess nutrients resulting from the agricultural pollution of Big Sugar plantations. Then-president of Friends of the Everglades, Joette Lorion (1998) stated, "Why should taxpayers be made to pay a billion dollars to clean up after big sugar, just because the government agencies don't have the will to enforce the Clean Water Act and make the polluters pay?" Friends continues to fight against this issue in the courts (2011).

Legal actions by Friends of the Everglades have gone to the Supreme Court of the United States on two occasions. In 2003 Friends of the Everglades and the Miccosukee Indian Tribe argued the so-called "S-9" lawsuit over the protection of the Everglades. The Supreme Court sent the case back to the District Court to be reargued in the fall of 2004. Previous Florida Governor Rick Scott has stated that he favors "restoration, not litigation," which provides a hopeful rallying cry for environmentalists. However, state funding for what is required to prevent and clean chemical pollution in the Everglades is not adequate to address the needs of the ecosystem. Enforcement of "better management practices" in big sugar farming cuts off the pollution at its source. The state seems willing to negotiate the two sides of the contentious debate, that of big sugar and conservationists, but environmentalists are not convinced that it will be enough to adequately address the needs of the Everglades.

Friends of the Everglades has strongly criticized the Comprehensive Everglades Restoration Plan, stating that it does not adequately address many critical needs. However, it does support the broader goals of this Federal plan, which dates from 1948, to protect the Everglades.
In 2004, the Miccosukee tribe along with Friends of the Everglades initiated a lawsuit which accused the Environmental Protection Agency and DEP of failing to enforce the federal Clean Water Act.

In 2009, a court victory for Friends of the Everglades was overturned by an appeals court, where the federal appellate court based its opinion on the "unitary waters" theory, which is an interpretation of the Clean Water Act which treats all bodies of water in the United States as a single body. The implication of this was that transferring polluted water from one body of water to another, even if polluted water was being transferred to pristine water, is considered to be legal. The focus of the ongoing legal debate has been on the definition of the word "addition" in the Clean Water Act. The Clean Water Act mandates that the addition of pollutants to clean water requires a federal permit. If polluted water is being transferred one body of water to another, some courts have interpreted this as meaning no permit is needed, whereas other courts have maintained that the wording of the Clean Water Act was not intended to allow transference of polluted water from, for example, a polluted stream to a pristine lake. 

The Columbia Journal of Environmental Law states that environmentalists are opposed to the "unitary waters" theory because it exempts polluters from obtaining federal permits which are usually required for polluting bodies of water, so long as the transferrer does not add additional pollutants to the transferred water.

According to Friends, in the case of the Everglades, the Bush administration bypassed legal efforts to protect the Everglades from harmful back-pumping through initiating the Water Transfer Rule, which allowed the transfer of polluted water into pristine waters such as in the Everglades without federal permits. Friends of the Everglades and other conservation groups continues to legally challenge the looser interpretation of the Clean Water Act but has not been totally successful. However, recent developments seem to have resulted in some progress. 

Friends of the Everglades placed hope with the inauguration of the Barack Obama administration that it would repeal what Friends sees as a harmful way of interpreting environmental law. The organization states that such efforts are finally yielding "significant results".

Current activity

The Friends of the Everglades organization continues to oppose efforts for government intervention for US Sugar Corporation environmental pollution, and maintains a close alliance with the Miccosukee Indian Tribe of the Everglades region in its legal efforts. One of the major issues continues to be the heavy use of chemical fertilizers by "Big Sugar" which result in excess phosphorus in Everglades waters. According to activists, government agencies have been lax in their demands on the sugar industry.

In a September 2011 press release concerning current activity, Friends of the Everglades stated that it felt that the Florida Governor and Florida Legislature had "acted to protect the sugar industry from paying its fair share of pollution treatment," shifting the responsibility to the taxpayers of Florida. Friends states, "This scheme has not only created one of the nation's largest environmental catastrophes, it has also perpetrated one of the largest rip-offs of taxpayers in American history to benefit billionaire industrial farmers." While Friends of the Everglades was not happy with the Bush administration's EPA, they are more hopeful with the EPA under President Obama, stating, "As a result of successful legal efforts by Friends of the Everglades and the Miccosukee Tribe, the EPA under President Obama changed direction and has now identified a realistic plan to clean up the Everglades."
Membership in Friends of the Everglades is thirty-five dollars (2010).

Young Friends of the Everglades
Friends of the Everglades promotes environmental awareness among young people in Miami-Dade County Public Schools with the organization's Young Friends of the Everglades program. The mission of Young Friends of the Everglades is, "To preserve and protect the Everglades, not just for us, but for future generations through education and children's awareness." 

Young Friends of the Everglades was started in 1994 by fourth and fifth grade students at Howard Drive Elementary School in Miami, Florida, along with their teachers, Marta Whitehouse and Connie Washburn. The student organization was first formed in response to plans to build a sports and entertainment park on an area considered essential for wetlands restoration. Young Friends has educated 80,000 students in conservation. The founder of Friends of the Everglades, Marjory Douglas, stated, at 105 years old about Young Friends of the Everglades, "Take the children out to the Glades and let them learn; education will be the only way to save the Glades. Tell them the Everglades isn't saved yet!" Membership in Young Friends of the Everglades is $1 and school classes may join for $15 (2010). Jim McMaster is Senior Educator of Young Friends of the Everglades (2011).

Board of directors
The board of directors of Friends of the Everglades includes Philip Kushlan,
President; Alan Farago, Conservation Chair; Robert M. Stein, Esq., Treasurer; Connie Washburn, Secretary. 
Directors are Elizabeth Wheaton, Camila Quaresma-Sharp, Dr. Paul Martin, Christienne H. Sherouse, Esq., and Milda Vaivada.

References

External links
 Friends of the Everglades
 Friends of the Everglades - Facebook page
  Federal Criminal Law Opinions
Friends of the Everglades v South Florida Water Management District. Case No. 07-13829. June 4, 2009

Friends of the Everglades v. So. Fla. Water Mgmt. June 8, 2009. Environmental Decisions of the U.S. Court of Appeals
 Friends of the Everglades calls on Scott to make polluters pay, The Florida Independent. July 27, 2011.

Everglades
Environmental organizations based in Florida
Environmental issues in Florida
Water organizations in the United States
1969 establishments in Florida
Organizations established in 1969
Organizations based in Miami